KSHL may refer to:

 KSHL (FM), a radio station (97.5 FM) licensed to serve Lincoln Beach, Oregon, United States
 KRLZ, a radio station (93.7 FM) licensed to serve Waldport, Oregon, which held the call sign KSHL in 2016
 KEQB, a radio station (97.5 FM) licensed to serve Gleneden Beach, Oregon, which held the call sign KSHL from 1991 to 2016